Rhyncharrhena is a genus of plants in the Apocynaceae first described as a genus in 1859 by Ferdinand von Mueller. It contains only one known species, Rhyncharrhena linearis, native to Australia, which is found in all mainland states and territories.

formerly included in genus
moved to Daemia 
 Rhyncharrhena atropurpurea F. Muell., synonym of Daemia atropurpurea F.Muell.
 Rhyncharrhena quinquepartita F. Muell, synonym of Daemia quinquepartita F.Muell.
The species, Rhyncharrhena linearis, was described in 1980 by Karen Wilson.

References

Monotypic Apocynaceae genera
Flora of Australia
Taxa named by Ferdinand von Mueller